All Saints' Church, Calbourne is a parish church in the Church of England located in Calbourne, Isle of Wight.

History

The church is medieval. The tower was rebuilt in 1752.
The churchyard contains Commonwealth war graves of two British Army soldiers of World War I.

Church status

The church is grouped with Holy Spirit Church, Newtown.

Organ

The church has a two manual organ dating from 1873 by Forster and Andrews. A specification of the organ can be found on the National Pipe Organ Register.

References

Church of England church buildings on the Isle of Wight